Øyvind Dahl (born 12 May 1951, in Oslo) is a retired Norwegian long-distance runner. He represented IL i BUL.
At the European Championships he finished fifteenth in 10,000 metres in 1978 and ninth in marathon in 1982. He also competed at the 1983 World Championships and the 1984 Summer Olympics as well as the World Cross Country Championships in 1979, 1980 and 1983 without success. He became Norwegian champion in 10,000 m in 1981.

He won the City-Pier-City Loop half marathon in the Hague three times (1979–1981).

Personal bests
5000 metres - 13:34.9 min (1978) - eleventh among Norwegian 5000 m runners.
10,000 metres - 28:32.5 min (1978) - twelfth among Norwegian 10,000 m runners.
Half marathon - 1:02:46 min (1980) - third among Norwegian marathon runners, only behind Geir Kvernmo and Roy Andersen.
Marathon - 2:11:40 min (1980) - third among Norwegian marathon runners, only behind Geir Kvernmo and Stig Roar Husby.

Achievements

References

External links

sports-reference

1951 births
Living people
Norwegian male long-distance runners
Norwegian male marathon runners
Athletes (track and field) at the 1984 Summer Olympics
Olympic athletes of Norway
Athletes from Oslo
Place of birth missing (living people)